
Gmina Klembów is a rural gmina (administrative district) in Wołomin County, Masovian Voivodeship, in east-central Poland.

Villages
Gmina Klembów contains the villages and settlements of Dobczyn, Karolew, Klembów, Krusze, Krzywica, Lipka, Michałów, Nowy Kraszew, Ostrówek, Pasek, Pieńki, Rasztów, Roszczep, Sitki, Stary Kraszew, Tuł and Wola Rasztowska.

Neighbouring gminas
Gmina Klembów is bordered by the gminas of Dąbrówka, Poświętne, Radzymin, Tłuszcz and Wołomin.

References

 Polish official population figures 2006

Klembow
Wołomin County